Ashton Charles Agar (born 14 October 1993) is an Australian cricketer who has played all forms of the game at international level. Agar plays domestically for Western Australia and the Perth Scorchers. A left-handed spin bowler, he played two Test matches for the Australian national side during the 2013 Ashes series.

Early life and domestic career
Agar was born in Melbourne, to Sonia Hewawissa, a Sri Lankan mother and John Agar, an Australian father, and has two younger brothers, Will and Wes. He attended Melbourne's De La Salle College, graduating in 2011.

He represented Victoria at both under-17 and under-19 level. After good form at the 2010–11 National Under-17 Championships, where he took 16 wickets at an average of 11.75 bowling left-arm orthodox spin, he was selected to play for the Australian under-19s for a series against the West Indies under-19s in the United Arab Emirates. Making his debut at the age of 17, Agar went on to play one under-19 Test and ten under-19 One Day International (ODI) matches for Australia. At the 2012 Under-19 World Cup, he was named in the squad as Australia's second spinner behind Ashton Turner, but did not play a match at the tournament.

Having failed to gain selection at senior level for Victoria, Agar moved to Western Australia for the 2012–13 season, where he was awarded a contract with the Western Australian Cricket Association (WACA). He made his first-class debut for Western Australia in a Sheffield Shield match against New South Wales in January 2013, replacing the injured Michael Beer as the side's spinner. In his second Shield match, early the following month, he scored 53 runs in Western Australia's second innings, putting on a state Sheffield Shield record partnership of 94 runs for the tenth wicket with Michael Hogan (43*). Agar made his List A debut for Western Australia in the limited-overs Ryobi One-Day Cup in late January, and took five wickets from his two matches, with his best figures 3/51 against Queensland.

Agar made his Sheffield Shield debut in January 2013. The following month, he was called up for Australia's 2012–13 tour of India, where he played a single tour match. Agar toured England and Ireland with Australia A in mid-2013, performing well in the English conditions. Although originally not selected in the touring squad, he made his Test debut for Australia in the first Test of the 2013 Ashes series. Coming in with the score on 117/9, Agar scored 98 runs batting eleventh in Australia's first innings, Agar broke several Test records on debut, including the highest score by a number-11 batsman and the highest partnership for the tenth wicket (with Phillip Hughes – since broken). However, after poor bowling, he was dropped from the team after the second Test of the series.

In February 2013, Agar was a late inclusion in the Australian squad for the 2012–13 tour of India, and played a single match on tour, taking 3/107 against India A. He finished the Sheffield Shield season with 19 wickets from five matches, including a five-wicket haul, 5/65, taken against South Australia in early March. In the same match, Agar was again involved in a substantial last-wicket partnership with Michael Hogan, with the pair adding 68 to enable Western Australia to win by one wicket. In his previous match, against Tasmania, he had scored 71 not out in Western Australia's fourth innings of 8/351, helping the team win by two wickets, and he finished the season with 229 runs at an average of 32.71, finishing third in the team's batting averages.

Agar made his Twenty20 debut for the Perth Scorchers in the 2013 Champions League Twenty20 in India. He was used primarily as an opening batsman at the tournament, bowling only 4.2 overs across three matches (from which he conceded 51 runs without taking a wicket). Against the Mumbai Indians, he scored 35 from 40 balls, which was his highest score in twenty20s . Agar played only a single match during the 2013–14 Big Bash League season, but the following season featured in eight of the Scorchers' ten matches. He took eight wickets at an average of 24.25, ranked thirteenth in the competition and fourth for the Scorchers, behind Jason Behrendorff, Yasir Arafat, and Andrew Tye. Only two spinners – Cameron Boyce (10) and Adam Zampa (9) – took more wickets at the tournament. When the 2014–15 Sheffield Shield season resumed after the conclusion of the Big Bash League, Agar was man of the match against South Australia, taking an inaugural ten-wicket haul (5/133 and 5/81) and also scoring 64 in Western Australia's first innings. In the next match, against New South Wales, he took 4/22 in the second innings, helping to bowl New South Wales out for 97.

At WACA district level, Agar plays for University. He previously played for the Richmond Cricket Club in Victorian Premier Cricket.

International career

Agar was selected to tour England, Scotland, and Ireland with Australia A in June 2013. Along with Fawad Ahmed, he was generally considered to be competing for a final position in Australia's squad for the 2013 Ashes series in England. A spot in the squad for a second spinner, behind Nathan Lyon, had been kept open to be given to one of the two spinners, based on form in the lead-up to the tour. Following his good form for Australia A, Agar was named to make his Test debut in the first Test of the series (played at Trent Bridge, Nottingham), replacing Lyon in the side from the previous tour. Aged 19 years and 269 days, he became the twelfth-youngest Australian Test player, as well as the youngest Australian since Archie Jackson (during the 1928–29 series) to make his Test debut in the Ashes. On debut, he scored 98 runs from 101 balls batting eleventh in Australia's first innings, breaking several Test records, including first player to ever score a half-century as a number eleven batsman on debut, highest score by a number eleven batsman, and, with Phillip Hughes, highest partnership (163 runs) for the tenth wicket.

Agar played in the first two Tests of the series, and despite his debut batting performance, had very limited success with the ball, taking 0/24, 2/82, 0/44 and 0/98 for a bowling average of 124. He was subsequently dropped from the team for the third and fourth Tests, and returned home due to illness ahead of the final Test. Lyon replaced him in the side. During India's 2014–15 tour of Australia, he was added to Australia's squad for the Fourth Test, a dead rubber on a spin-friendly pitch at the Sydney Cricket Ground, but he did not play in the match, with Lyon preferred as Australia's sole spinner.

In 2015, Agar was not granted a spot for The Ashes squad, instead becoming a fixture in the List A squad. He would make his limited-overs debut following the Ashes series.

He made his One Day International debut against England on 8 September 2015. He made his Twenty20 International debut for Australia against South Africa on 6 March 2016.

In 2017, Agar was recalled to the Australian test side for their tour of Bangladesh, and in the first test match, took 5 wickets in total, as well as scoring an impressive 41 not out in Australia's first innings. Despite his efforts, Australia lost to Bangladesh for the first time in Test cricket.

In April 2018, he was awarded a national contract by Cricket Australia for the 2018–19 season.

On 21 February 2020, in the first T20I match against South Africa, Agar became the second bowler for Australia, and 13th overall, to take a hat-trick in a T20I match. He finished the match with figures of 5/24 from his four overs, his first five-wicket haul in a T20I match.

In April 2020, Cricket Australia awarded Agar with a central contract ahead of the 2020–21 season. On 16 July 2020, Agar was named in a 26-man preliminary squad of players to begin training ahead of a possible tour to England following the COVID-19 pandemic. On 14 August 2020, Cricket Australia confirmed that the fixtures would be taking place, with Agar included in the touring party.

On 3 March 2021, during the series against New Zealand, Agar took the best figures for a bowler for Australia, and the fifth-best figures overall in T20Is, with 6/30 from his four overs. In August 2021, Agar was named in Australia's squad for the 2021 ICC Men's T20 World Cup.

In March 2022, Agar was added to the Australian test, ODI, and T20 squad ahead of its tour of Pakistan. However, Agar was withdrawn from the T20 squad after testing positive for coronavirus.

To provide spin depth to the Australian test squad during its series against South Africa, Agar was added for the fifth and final test match in Sydney. He was named in the Australian test XI for the first time in five years, as an all-rounder option following Cameron Green's dislocated finger injury.

References

External links
 

1993 births
Australia One Day International cricketers
Australia Test cricketers
Australia Twenty20 International cricketers
Australian cricketers
Australian people of Sri Lankan descent
Cricketers from Melbourne
Living people
Middlesex cricketers
Perth Scorchers cricketers
Richmond cricketers
Western Australia cricketers
Twenty20 International hat-trick takers